Smith's frog may refer to:

 Smith's litter frog, a frog found in Southeast Asia
 Smith's wrinkled frog, a frog found in Thailand and possibly Myanmar

Animal common name disambiguation pages